Chulachomklao bridge is a railway bridge over the Tapi River in Tambon Tha Kham, Amphoe Phunphin, Surat Thani Province in southern Thailand. It was officially opened in 1916. The bridge was severely damaged during World War II, was repaired 1952-1953 and officially reopened in 1953.

The bridge is located 1.3 km from Surat Thani Railway Station. The bridge has 3 spans, all of through-truss design.

Location
The Chulachomklao bridge is live Surat Thani, Thailand.

References

External links
 Photos of the bridge (2008) 

Buildings and structures in Surat Thani province
Bridges completed in 1916
Railway bridges in Thailand